Kobus Jonker is a paralympic athlete from South Africa competing mainly in category F37 throwing events.

Kobus competed in the 2000 Summer Paralympics in Sydney where as well as finishing seventh in the discus he also won a silver in the F37 javelin.

References

Paralympic athletes of South Africa
Athletes (track and field) at the 2000 Summer Paralympics
Paralympic silver medalists for South Africa
Living people
Medalists at the 2000 Summer Paralympics
Year of birth missing (living people)
Paralympic medalists in athletics (track and field)
South African male javelin throwers
20th-century South African people
21st-century South African people